Flashing lights may refer to:

 headlight flashing
 emergency vehicle lighting

Flashing Lights may refer to:

Music
 Flashing Lights (album), an album by Havana Brown

Songs
 "Flashing Lights" (Kanye West song), 2007
 "Flashing Lights" (Chase & Status and Sub Focus song), 2011
 "Flashing Lights" (Havana Brown song), 2013
"Flashing Lights", a song by Hawkshaw Hawkins Shorty Long, Bob Anthon 1954
"Flashing Lights", a song by Kenny Gardner	B. J. Hunter, Gerald Lee 1979
"Flashing Lights", a song by Lord Sutch And Heavy Friends 1972
"Flashing Lights", a song by Tyvek  2008